Bintanding Jarju (born 10 April 1957) is a former member of the Pan-African Parliament of the African Union from the Gambia. She is the former member of the National Assembly for Foni Brefet.

In the 2002, parliamentary elections, Jarju stood as a candidate for the Alliance for Patriotic Reorientation and Construction (APRC) in the Foni Berefet constituency and successfully won the constituency due to a lack of opposing candidates.

In the following elections in 2007, Jawla remained unopposed and continued to represent the constituency in parliament. From 2004, she was simultaneously nominated as a member (2004-2009 and 2009-2014) of the Pan-African Parliament of the African Union. There she served on the Committee on Gender Issues.

References 

1957 births
Living people
Members of the National Assembly of the Gambia
Members of the Pan-African Parliament from the Gambia
21st-century Gambian women politicians
21st-century Gambian politicians
Women members of the Pan-African Parliament